"Parents" is the sixth episode of the eighth season of the American television medical drama series House and the 161st overall episode of the series. It aired on Fox Network in the United States on November 14, 2011.

Plot

Ben Parker, a patient who wishes to follow in his father's footsteps as an entertainer, is admitted with partial paralysis. As they look for a bone marrow match, the team discovers a disturbing family secret. Meanwhile, House looks for creative ways to remove his ankle monitor so that he can attend a boxing match in Atlantic City. John Scurti plays a patient convinced he is suffering from diabetes. Taub faces a major decision when his ex-wife Rachel announces she plans on moving across country with their daughter.

Jennifer Crystal Foley and Zena Grey return to the series.

Reception
The A.V. Club gave this episode a C+ rating. It was watched by 6.63 million viewers.

References

External links

"Parents" at Fox.com
Medical review of "Parents"

House (season 8) episodes
2011 American television episodes